David Selvas (born 21 December 1971) is a Spanish actor. He has appeared in 27 films and television shows since 1996. He starred in the film Pau and His Brother, which was entered into the 2001 Cannes Film Festival.

Selected filmography
 Caresses (1998)
 Pau and His Brother (2001)

References

External links

1971 births
Living people
Spanish male film actors
Male actors from Barcelona